Keith Gordon Sharpley (16 March 1909 – 12 September 1970) was an Australian rules footballer who played with Hawthorn in the Victorian Football League (VFL).

Notes

External links 

1909 births
1970 deaths
Australian rules footballers from Victoria (Australia)
Hawthorn Football Club players